Harry Austryn Wolfson (November 2, 1887 – September 19, 1974) was an American scholar, philosopher, and historian at Harvard University, and the first chairman of a Judaic Studies Center in the United States.  He is known for his seminal work on the Jewish philosopher Philo, but he also authored an astonishing variety of other works on Crescas, Maimonides, Averroes, Spinoza, the Kalam, the Church Fathers, and the foundations of Western religion.  He collapsed the artificial barriers that isolated the study of Christian philosophy from Islamic philosophy and from Jewish philosophy .    Being the first Judaica scholar to progress through an entire career at a top-tier university , in Wolfson is also represented the fulfillment of the goals of the 19th-century Wissenschaft des Judentums movement.

Biography 
Wolfson was born to Sarah Savitsky and Max Mendel Wolfson in Astryna (Yiddish: Ostrin), Vilna Governorate (in present-day Shchuchyn district, Grodno Region, Belarus), and in his youth he studied at the Slabodka yeshiva under Rabbi Moshe Mordechai Epstein. He emigrated to the U.S. with his family in 1903. In September 1908, Wolfson arrived in Cambridge, Massachusetts and earned his bachelor's degree and Ph.D. from Harvard University, where he remained for the rest of his career, excepting the years 1912–1914, when he held a traveling fellowship from Harvard which enabled him to study and do research in Europe, and some months in 1918 when he was conscripted into the Army, and together with Norbert Wiener received basic training at Fort Slocum, New York, and was then transferred to the Adjutant General's Office in Washington, D.C.. R.D. Crouse, the scholar of early medieval theology, was among his students.

Wolfson was a professor at Harvard University for approximately half a century, and was a student and friend both of George Santayana and George Foot Moore.  He received honorary degrees from 10 different universities , and was a founding member and president of the American Academy for Jewish Research.   He died in Cambridge, Massachusetts on September 19, 1974.  His brother Nathan survived him by 27 years, living to age 101 until 2001.  Another notable family member was his nephew Erwin S. Wolfson who developed the Pan Am Building in Manhattan in 1960.

Works

Wolfson was a tireless scholar.  About him  writes, "He was reminiscent of an old-fashioned gaon, transposed into a modern university setting, studying day and night, resisting presumptive attractions and distractions, honors and chores, with a tenacity which sometimes seemed awkward and antisocial."  He spent vast amounts of time secluded in the Widener Library pursuing his research.    writes that even in his retirement, Wolfson was "still the first person to enter Widener library in the morning and the last to leave it at night."

Wolfson wrote works including a translation and commentary on Hasdai Crescas' Or Adonai, the philosophy of the church fathers, the repercussions of the Kalam on Judaism, and  works on Spinoza, Philo, and Averroes.   The best-known  of these works are listed below, their publication in several instances—among them the work on Philo—having been considered scholarly events of the first magnitude.

Wolfson was additionally known as a "daring" scholar, one who was not afraid to put forward a bold hypothesis with limited evidential support.  In his work Wolfson therefore often chooses bold conjecture over safe, but boring, analyses .

Books 

 Crescas' Critique of Aristotle: Problems of Aristotle's Physics in Jewish and Arabic philosophy (1929)
 The Philosophy of Spinoza: Unfolding the Latent Processes of His Reasoning, Harvard University Press (1934/1962). 
 Philo: Foundations of Religious Philosophy in Judaism, Christianity and Islam, Harvard University Press (1947). Until the publication of this book, Philo had been considered no more than a preacher with a philosophic bent. Wolfson showed that behind the philosophic utterances scattered throughout Philo's writings there lay a coherent philosophic system. Wolfson went even further, claiming that Philo was the founder of religious philosophy in Judaism, Christianity, and Islam, and that "Philonic" philosophy dominated European thought for 17 centuries until it was destroyed by Spinoza, the last of the medievals and the first of the moderns.
 The Philosophy of the Church Fathers: Volume I Faith Trinity, Incarnation, Harvard University Press (1956)
 The Philosophy of the Kalam, Harvard University Press (1976)
 Repercussions of the Kalam in Jewish philosophy, Harvard University Press (1979)

Articles 
He was known principally, as mentioned above, for crossing all artificial boundaries of scholarship, as best revealed by the titles of some of his papers:
 The meaning of "Ex Nihilo" in the Church Fathers, Arabic and Hebrew philosophy, and St. Thomas (1948)
 The double faith theory in Clement, Saadia, Averroes and St. Thomas, and its origin in Aristotle and the Stoics (1942)
 The internal senses in Latin, Arabic, and Hebrew philosophical texts (1935)
 The amphibolous terms in Aristotle, Arabic philosophy, and Maimonides (1938)
Solomon Pappenheim on time and space and his relation to Locke and Kant, pp. 426–440 in Jewish studies in memory of Israel Abrahams, Press of the Jewish Institute of Religion (1927)

Awards and Honors 

 1933: Elected to the American Academy of Arts and Sciences
 1949: National Jewish Book Award in the Jewish Thought category for Philo: Foundations of Religious Philosophy in Judaism, Christianity and Islam
 1956: Elected to the American Philosophical Society

Footnotes

References
 .
 .
 .
 . link

Judaic scholars
Spinoza scholars
Jewish American writers
Harvard University faculty
Harvard University alumni
American people of Lithuanian-Jewish descent
Emigrants from the Russian Empire to the United States
Lithuanian Jews
1887 births
1974 deaths
Fellows of the Medieval Academy of America